106th Street station may refer to:
 106th Street (IRT Third Avenue Line), an express station on the demolished IRT Third Avenue Line
 106th Street (Second Avenue Subway), a station on the proposed expansion of the Second Avenue Subway